Andre Tricoteux is a Canadian actor and stuntman, known for playing Colossus in Deadpool and Orc War Captain in Warcraft. He has done stunt work on many TV and movies such as Once Upon a Time, Seventh Son, and See No Evil 2.

In the 2016 Marvel film Deadpool, he portrayed the Colossus character in a restricted on-set motion capture performance and stunt work, a role he shared with fellow stuntman T. J. Storm. Serbian actor Stefan Kapičić, who was cast at the last moment, provided the character's voice, and the film's motion capture supervisor Greg LaSalle provided the final facial performance. Tricoteux's performance in the film has been blended by CGI with that of four other actors: the three aforementioned and stuntman Glenn Ennis for initial facial shapes.

Championship and accomplishments in professional wrestling
International Wrestling Association
IWA World Heavyweight Championship (1 time) 
IWA World Tag Team Championship (3 times) - with Miguel Pérez, Jr., Huracan Castillo, Ricky Banderas and Fidel Sierra as Los Intocables (1), Tiger Ali Singh (1) and Angel Rodríguez (1)

Filmography

Film

Television

Stunts

References

External links
 

Living people
Canadian male film actors
Canadian stunt performers
Year of birth missing (living people)